is a computer program that calculates and verifies SHA-1 hashes. It is commonly used to verify the integrity of files. It (or a variant) is installed by default on most Linux distributions.

It is included in GNU Core Utilities, Busybox (excluding ), and Toybox (excluding ). Ports to a wide variety of systems are available, including Microsoft Windows.

Examples 
To create a file with a SHA-1 hash in it, if one is not provided:
$ sha1sum filename [filename2] ... > SHA1SUM

If distributing one file, the  file extension may be appended to the filename e.g.:
$ sha1sum --binary my-zip.tar.gz > my-zip.tar.gz.sha1

The output contains one line per file of the form "{hash} SPACE (ASTERISK|SPACE) [{directory} SLASH] {filename}".  (Note well, if the hash digest creation is performed in text mode instead of binary mode, then there will be two space characters instead of a single space character and an asterisk.) For example:
$ sha1sum -b my-zip.tar.gz
d5db29cd03a2ed055086cef9c31c252b4587d6d0 *my-zip.tar.gz
$ sha1sum -b subdir/filename2
55086cef9c87d6d031cd5db29cd03a2ed0252b45 *subdir/filename2

To verify that a file was downloaded correctly or that it has not been tampered with:
$ sha1sum -c SHA1SUM
filename: OK
filename2: OK
$ sha1sum -c my-zip.tar.gz.sha1
my-zip.tar.gz: OK

Hash file trees
 can only create checksums of one or multiple files inside a directory, but not of a directory tree, i.e. of subdirectories, sub-subdirectories, etc. and the files they contain. This is possible by using  in combination with the find command with the  option, or by piping the output from  into xargs.  can create checksums of a directory tree.

To use  with :
$ find s_* -type f -exec sha1sum '{}' \;
65c23f142ff6bcfdddeccebc0e5e63c41c9c1721  s_1/file_s11
d3d59905cf5fc930cd4bf5b709d5ffdbaa9443b2  s_2/file_s21
5590e00ea904568199b86aee4b770fb1b5645ab8  s_a/file_02

Likewise, piping the output from  into  yields the same output:
$ find s_* -type f | xargs sha1sum
65c23f142ff6bcfdddeccebc0e5e63c41c9c1721  s_1/file_s11
d3d59905cf5fc930cd4bf5b709d5ffdbaa9443b2  s_2/file_s21
5590e00ea904568199b86aee4b770fb1b5645ab8  s_a/file_02

Related programs 
  is a Perl program to calculate any of SHA-1, 224, 256, 384, 512 hashes. It is part of the ActivePerl distribution.
  is a similarly named program that calculates SHA-3, HAKE, RawSHAKE, and Keccak functions.
These versions offer slightly different options and features. Additionally, FreeBSD offers the Skein family of message digests.

See also 
 
 
 
 GNU Core Utilities

References

External links 
 
 sha1sum for Windows announcement
 FreeBSD Manual Pages md5
 OpenBSD General Commands Manual md5

Cryptographic software
Unix security-related software